Theodosia viridiaurata are beetles from the family Scarabaeidae, subfamily Cetoniinae, tribe Phaedimini.

Description
The basic colour of the body is metallic green, but the elytra may be coppery or golden coloured. These scarab beetles bear a long lower horn and a second long horn on the pronotum. These impressive horns are usually reddish or purplish.

Distribution
This quite rare species can be found in Eastern Borneo.

References
 Global species
 Catalogue of Life
 Zipcodezoo

External links
 Theodosia viridiaurata on Flickr

Cetoniinae
Beetles described in 1889